Glasgow attack may refer to:
Glasgow pub bombings in 1979
2007 Glasgow Airport attack
Glasgow hotel stabbings in 2020